Henderson Township is a civil township of Wexford County in the U.S. state of Michigan. The population was 163 at the 2010 census, which makes it the least-populated township in the county and the sixth least-populated township in the Lower Peninsula.

Communities
Angola is a former settlement within the township.  It had a rural post office from December 20, 1899 until February 9, 1909.  The community appeared on a 1914 map of Henderson Township.

Geography

Major highways
 runs east–west through the center of the township.

Demographics
As of the census of 2000, there were 176 people, 73 households, and 57 families residing in the township. The population density was 4.9 per square mile (1.9/km2). There were 111 housing units at an average density of 3.1 per square mile (1.2/km2). The racial makeup of the township was 98.86% White, and 1.14% from two or more races. Hispanic or Latino of any race were 1.70% of the population.

There were 73 households, out of which 23.3% had children under the age of 18 living with them, 75.3% were married couples living together, 1.4% had a female householder with no husband present, and 21.9% were non-families. 19.2% of all households were made up of individuals, and 6.8% had someone living alone who was 65 years of age or older. The average household size was 2.41 and the average family size was 2.74.

In the township the population was spread out, with 16.5% under the age of 18, 8.0% from 18 to 24, 22.2% from 25 to 44, 35.2% from 45 to 64, and 18.2% who were 65 years of age or older. The median age was 46 years. For every 100 females, there were 109.5 males. For every 100 females age 18 and over, there were 107.0 males.

The median income for a household in the township was $32,000, and the median income for a family was $42,250. Males had a median income of $30,000 versus $17,500 for females. The per capita income for the township was $18,877. About 4.1% of families and 6.2% of the population were below the poverty line, including 13.0% of those under the age of eighteen and none of those 65 or over.

Education
Henderson Township is served entirely by Cadillac Area Public Schools to the east in Cadillac.

References

Townships in Michigan
Townships in Wexford County, Michigan
Populated places established in 1904
1904 establishments in Michigan